Ian White  (born 17 August 1970), nicknamed Diamond, is an English professional darts player currently playing in Professional Darts Corporation (PDC) events. White is the winner of 13 PDC ranking events, and has reached many quarter-finals in majors. In 2019, he reached his first major semi final.

Career
In 1997, White reached the final of the PDC's revived News of the World Darts Championship. He defeated Des Byrne, Gary Spedding, Peter Manley and Andy Jenkins on the way to the final, where he was defeated by Phil Taylor.

White won the Antwerp Open, Denmark Open and the English National Championship in 2009. He qualified for the 2010 BDO World Darts Championship, but lost 0-3 in the first round to Stephen Bunting. Shortly afterwards, he left the BDO and joined the PDC, when fellow Stoke player Adrian Lewis offered to sponsor White and suggested he was capable of being in the world's top eight. A solid first year in the PDC saw him reach the semi-finals of a Pro Tour event in Dublin, gain an automatic Tour Card, and narrowly miss out on the 2011 PDC World Championship by £100.

In February 2011, he reached his first PDC final since 1997. He lost 3-6 to Steve Brown in the final of the 2011 UK Open Qualifier 1.

White finished third in the 2011 Grand Slam of Darts wildcard qualifier, and was awarded a place in the tournament proper after Simon Whitlock withdrew due to injury.

2012
He qualified for his first PDC World Championship in 2012, where he was beaten 1-3 by Robert Thornton in the last 64. He threw a nine-dart finish in the opening Players Championship event of the season in a first round match against Mark Hylton. White reached the semi-finals of the event, where he was beaten 4-6 by the eventual winner Justin Pipe. In April, he earned a place in the European Tour Event 1 in Vienna by defeating Adrian Gray in the UK qualifier. He played Colin Lloyd in the first round and lost 3–6, with his opponent averaging 111. In May, he reached the final of the Players Championship Event 5 where he lost 2–6 to Dave Chisnall. He also qualified for the third European Tour Event with a win over John Scott, but was then beaten by Raymond van Barneveld 2–6 in the first round in Düsseldorf. By July, White had reached two semi-finals and two finals in PDC events in 2012, meaning he qualified for the World Matchplay for the first time in his career due to being the sixth highest player on the ProTour Order of Merit who was not in the world's top 16. He played Vincent van der Voort in the first round and took out 164 and 161 finishes in a 10–5 victory to set up a last 16 fixture with 12-time World Matchplay champion Phil Taylor, which he lost 3–13.

White threw his second nine-darter of the season in the fourth European Tour event, the German Darts Masters in a last 16 win against Andy Hamilton. He continued his momentum with a quarter-final deciding leg victory over Robert Thornton and a 6–4 semi-final win against Raymond van Barneveld. In the final he faced two-time reigning world champion and occasional practice partner Adrian Lewis, and was beaten 3–6. White's exceptional form carried on at his next event, the 11th Players Championship, as he beat the likes of Simon Whitlock and Terry Jenkins to reach the final. He played Michael van Gerwen and lost in a final for the fourth time this year following a 1–6 defeat. At the European Championship he exacted his revenge over Lewis with a sensational 6–0 whitewash in the first round. However, he lost to Kim Huybrechts 5–10 in his following match. At the World Grand Prix in October, White took out finishes of 144, 132 and 112 to beat van Barneveld 2–0 in sets and then faced Wes Newton in the last 16, where he was beaten 1–3. White came agonisingly close to winning his first PDC title in November, as he held a 4–0 lead over Michael van Gerwen in the final of the 18th Players Championship event, but went on to lose 5–6. After all 33 ProTour events of 2012 had been played, White finished eighth on the Order of Merit to qualify for the Players Championship Finals for the first time. He was beaten 5–6 by Michael Smith in the first round.

2013
White was just outside the top 32 ranked players who qualified automatically for the 2013 World Championship. However, his impressive play in events in 2012 earned him the first spot of sixteen that were available for non-qualified players via the ProTour Order of Merit. White was over £18,000 ahead of the second placed Michael Smith. He was beaten by Mark Webster 1–3 in the first round. However, after the tournament he was ranked world number 30, the first time White has been inside the top 32. He was beaten by Steve West 3–9 in the third round of the UK Open. At the eighth Players Championship in September, White won his first PDC tournament by defeating Simon Whitlock 6–3 in a final with an average of almost 101. He had earlier beaten two-time World Champion Adrian Lewis 6–1 and the title saw him move up to 23rd on the Order of Merit. White faced Dave Chisnall in the first round of the World Grand Prix and missed eight darts for legs in the deciding set to lose 2–1. He made his debut in the Championship League and won his group at the first time of asking by beating Peter Wright 6–4 in the final. In the Winners Group he won three of his seven matches to finish sixth in the eight man table. Whilst the top 16 players on the Order of Merit were competing in the Masters in November, White took full advantage by winning his second PDC ranking title at the 14th Players Championship with a 6–3 success over Andy Jenkins in the final. He beat Ronnie Baxter 6–3 and Terry Jenkins 9–2 at the Players Championship Finals to reach the quarter-finals of a PDC major event for the first time. White fell 4–0 down to Andy Hamilton and could never recover the deficit as he lost 9–6.

2014
White was the 21st seed for the 2014 World Championship and won his first ever match in the event by beating Australia's Kyle Anderson 3–1. He then survived a huge scare in the second round as Kim Huybrechts came back from 3–0 down to level, but White held his nerve to take the deciding set. He then produced a successful fightback in the third round against Richie Burnett by winning nine of eleven legs from 3–1 behind to triumph 4–3. In the quarter-finals White came up against fourth seed Simon Whitlock and trailed 3–0 and 4–1, but then won a trio of sets each by three legs to one to square the game at 4–4. White missed two darts to hold his throw in the fifth leg of the decider and lost the next leg to fall agonosingly short of reaching the semi-finals. He moved into the top 16 on the Order of Merit for the first time after the tournament. A third successive quarter-final in a major event came at the UK Open by beating Gary Anderson 9–7 in the fifth round. White faced Michael van Gerwen and trailed 6–2 and 8–5 but pulled the gap back to 9–8 before losing the next leg to fall just short of reaching his first televised semi-final.

His first final in the floor events of 2014 came at the fourth Players Championship, but he was whitewashed 6–0 by Phil Taylor. Another final followed at the sixth event and he led Robert Thornton 4–2 and 5–4, before missing six darts to win the match in the next leg, instead going on to lose 6–5. White ensured that he reached the second round of the World Matchplay for the third year running by seeing off Terry Jenkins 10–4, but then was heavily beaten 13–4 by Van Gerwen. White won his third PDC title at the penultimate Players Championship courtesy of a 6–2 success over Dave Chisnall.

2015
White won six consecutive legs against Kim Huybrechts in the second round of the 2015 World Championship to take a 3–2 lead, but from there could only win one more leg as he lost 4–3. White threw a nine-dart finish in a 6–3 victory over Mervyn King in the quarter-finals of the final UK Open Qualifier and then averaged 109.37 in edging past Raymond van Barneveld 6–5, before losing 6–2 against Phil Taylor in the final. He also hit a nine darter during a 6–3 success over Jamie Lewis in the semi-finals of the 11th Players Championship, but lost 6–1 to Dave Chisnall in the final. A third defeat in a final this year came at the 14th event where he was eliminated 6–2 by Jelle Klaasen.

White had a high quality game with Stephen Bunting in the first round of the World Matchplay as both players averaged over 100 (White the highest with 103.51), 17 maximums were thrown and White took out three ton-plus finishes to win 10–6. He played in the quarter-finals after ousting Simon Whitlock 13–9 and led Michael van Gerwen 6–1, before being pegged back to 7–7. White fell 12–10 behind, but produced a 12-dart leg to move 13–12 in front, before a host of missed doubles from White including seven in the final leg saw him lose 16–13. His first title of 2015 came at the 17th Players Championship when he held on from 5–1 ahead of Chisnall to win 6–5.

In the second round of the World Grand Prix, White averaged 97.96 in the double-to-start event in defeating reigning world champion Gary Anderson 3–1 in sets. Although he averaged 20 points lower in the quarter-finals against Robert Thornton, the match went to a deciding leg at 2–2 in sets which White lost. He was eliminated out of the European Championship at the first round stage and couldn't get out of his group at the Grand Slam. However, deciding leg victories over Raymond van Barneveld and Gerwyn Price saw White reach his third major quarter-final of the year at the Players Championship Finals. White's search for a first PDC semi-final will go on though, as he was ousted 10–6 by Mensur Suljović.

2016
White took the first set against Dimitri van den Bergh in the opening round of the 2016 World Championship, but went on to lose 3–1. As his popularity rose, many fans began to sing The Third Rock From the Sun theme tune at his matches due to his similarity to John Lithgow. The song appeared to irritate him on stage as he was defeated 9–6 by Simon Whitlock in the third round of the UK Open, but in the final of the fifth Players Championship event whitewashed world number one Michael van Gerwen 6–0 in the final, with an average of 106.20. White also secured the 11th event with a 6–3 win over Joe Cullen. After comfortably seeing off Daryl Gurney 10–2 in the first round of the World Matchplay, White lost 11–6 to Peter Wright. He returned to win his third Players Championship crown of the year and seventh PDC tournament in his career by beating Benito van de Pas 6–4. White eliminated Terry Jenkins 6–2 at the European Championship and came back from 8–3 to force a deciding leg against Mensur Suljović, but lost it to be defeated 10–9. His titles during the year qualified him for the Grand Slam and a win over Darryl Fitton would have seen him progress from his group, but he lost 5–4 from being 3–1 up and missed three match darts in the process.

2017

White faced Peter Wright in the third round of the 2017 World Championship after overcoming Kevin Simm 3–0 and Jonny Clayton 4–1. He lost nine of the first ten legs and could never recover in a 4–1 defeat. His quarter-final with Gerwyn Price at the UK Open went to a deciding leg and White was on 20 to win but burst his score by hitting double 15 to allow Price to edge through 10–9. White thrashed Michael van Gerwen 6–1 to reach the semi-finals of the German Darts Open, where he lost 6–3 to Benito van de Pas. His first final of the year was at the 11th Players Championship, but he missed five darts for the title in a 6–5 defeat to Rob Cross.

World Championship results

BDO

2010: First round (lost to Stephen Bunting 0–3)

PDC

2012: First round (lost to Robert Thornton 1–3)
2013: First round (lost to Mark Webster 1–3)
2014: Quarter-finals (lost to Simon Whitlock 4–5)
2015: Second round (lost to Kim Huybrechts 3–4)
2016: First round (lost to Dimitri van den Bergh 1–3)
2017: Third round (lost to Peter Wright 1–4)
2018: Second round (lost to Gerwyn Price 1–4)
2019: Second round (lost to Devon Petersen 2–3)
2020: Second round (lost to Darius Labanauskas 1–3)
2021: Second round (lost to Kim Huybrechts 1–3)
2022: Third round (lost to Gary Anderson 3–4)

Career finals

Independent major finals: 1 (1 runner-up)

Performance timeline
 

PDC European Tour

References

External links
Official website (archived)

{{#ifexpr:<21|}}

1970 births
Living people
English darts players
Sportspeople from Stoke-on-Trent
Professional Darts Corporation current tour card holders
PDC ranking title winners